Rikuya Hoshino (星野陸也, Hoshino Rikuya, born 12 May 1996) is a Japanese professional golfer. He has played full-time on the Japan Golf Tour since 2017 and has won six times on the tour.

Professional career
Hoshino turned professional in August 2016. In early 2017, he won the Novil Cup on the Japan Challenge Tour.

Since 2017, Hoshino has played on the main Japan Golf Tour. His first win came in September 2018 at the Fujisankei Classic which he won by 5 strokes. With eight more top-10 finishes he finished 2018 as the 6th highest money winner on the tour. Hoshino qualified for the 2018 U.S. Open, his first major, where he missed the cut.

In May 2019, Hoshino lost in a playoff for the Kansai Open Golf Championship before winning his second Japan Golf Tour event at the Dunlop Srixon Fukushima Open in June, a tournament reduced to 54 holes. A third-place finish in the Japan PGA Championship the following week lifted him into the top-100 of the Official World Golf Ranking. Later in 2019, he finished runner-up in the RIZAP KBC Augusta.

Hoshino won the Fujisankei Classic for the second time in 2020, beating Mikumu Horikawa at the third hole of a sudden-death playoff.

Professional wins (7)

Japan Golf Tour wins (6)

*Note: The 2019 Dunlop Srixon Fukushima Open was shortened to 54 holes due to weather.

Japan Golf Tour playoff record (1–2)

Japan Challenge Tour wins (1)

Results in major championships
Results not in chronological order before 2019 and in 2020.

CUT = missed the halfway cut
"T" = Tied
NT = No tournament due to COVID-19 pandemic

References

External links

Japanese male golfers
Japan Golf Tour golfers
Olympic golfers of Japan
Golfers at the 2020 Summer Olympics
Sportspeople from Ibaraki Prefecture
1996 births
Living people
21st-century Japanese people